24 Field Artillery Regiment was an artillery regiment of the South African Artillery.

Origin
This unit was formed as 24 Field Artillery Regiment in 1976 and was based in Durban.
As a composite unit, its structure consisted of:
 a couple of gun batteries,
 medium mortars and,
 counter artillery locating radar elements.(typically using the Cymbeline Mk1 locating radar)

Commandant R. Pemberton was the Commanding officer.

Operations
The regiment was added to the operational control of Natal Command. As a Citizen Force Regiment, its primary function was artillery support and it secondary function as infantry. The regiment did at least one tour of duty in South West Africa but mainly conducted training camps in northern Natal.

Traditions
The regiment had a typical artillery tradition and instead of having colours considered its cannons its colours.

References 

 Further reading:

External links
 Defenceweb fact file
 Gunner's Association

Artillery regiments of South Africa
Disbanded military units and formations in Durban
Military units and formations established in 1976
Military units and formations of South Africa in the Border War